V pokušení is a 1939 Czechoslovak romance film, directed by Miroslav Cikán. It stars  Jiří Dohnal, Ladislav Boháč and Marie Glázrová.

References

External links
V pokušení at the Internet Movie Database

1939 films
Czechoslovak romance films
1930s romance films
Films directed by Miroslav Cikán
Czech romantic films
Czechoslovak black-and-white films
1930s Czech films